Kingsley Osezele Ehizibue (born 25 May 1995) is a professional footballer who plays as a right back for Serie A club Udinese Calcio. Born in Germany and raised in the Netherlands, he represents Nigeria internationally.

Early years
Ehizibue was born in Germany to Nigerian parents, but moved to the Netherlands at 2 years of age, growing up in Zwolle. He started playing football at local amateur outfit CSV'28.

Club career
Ehizibue made his professional debut for PEC Zwolle on 29 October 2014 against HHC Hardenberg in a Dutch Cup game and made his Eredivisie debut on 13 December 2014 against Willem II.

On 31 May 2019, it was announced that Ehizibue would be transferred to Bundesliga club 1. FC Köln, where he signed a four-year contract until 2023.

On 30 August 2022, Udinese Calcio announced that Ehizibue would join the club on a contract until 2026.

International career
On 3 March 2020, Ehizibue was called up by the Nigerian national team head coach Gernot Rohr as part of the team players lined up for the fixture against the Sierra Leone national team.

Personal life
Ehizibue is an evangelical Christian who regularly attends Hillsong Church and other evangelical churches.

Career statistics

References

External links
 
 
Netherlands profile at OnsOranje

1995 births
Living people
Footballers from Munich
Sportspeople from Zwolle
Nigerian footballers
Dutch footballers
Netherlands youth international footballers
Nigerian emigrants to the Netherlands
Footballers from Overijssel
Dutch people of Nigerian descent
Naturalised citizens of the Netherlands
Citizens of Nigeria through descent
Association football fullbacks
PEC Zwolle players
1. FC Köln players
Udinese Calcio players
Eredivisie players
Bundesliga players
Dutch expatriate footballers
Nigerian expatriate footballers
Expatriate footballers in Germany
Expatriate footballers in Italy
Dutch expatriate sportspeople in Germany
Nigerian expatriate sportspeople in Germany
Dutch expatriate sportspeople in Italy
Nigerian expatriate sportspeople in Italy
Dutch evangelicals
Nigerian evangelicals